Qasr Abu Samrah is a village and archaeological site in Syria, administratively a part of the Hama District of the Hama Governorate, located  northeast of Hama city. Nearby localities include Zughba to the north, al-Tulaysiyah to northwest, al-Junaynah to the west, Fan al-Shamali and Qasr al-Makhram to the southwest, Duma to the southeast, and al-Hazim to the northeast. 

According to the Syria Central Bureau of Statistics, Qasr Abu Samrah had a population of 849 in the 2004 census. Its inhabitants are predominantly Alawites.

Qasr Abu Samrah contains the ruins of a Byzantine-era tower and church, both of them not well-preserved. The church was built completely from basalt. One row of five columns, out of the original two, remains standing, large doorway of the structure.

References

Bibliography

Alawite communities in Syria
Populated places in Hama District
Archaeological sites in Hama Governorate